In mathematics, Green's identities are a set of three identities in vector calculus relating the bulk with the boundary of a region on which differential operators act. They are named after the mathematician George Green, who discovered Green's theorem.

Green's first identity
Then

Note that Green's first identity above is a special case of the more general identity derived from the divergence theorem by substituting ,

Green's second identity

For the special case of  all across , then,

Explicitly incorporating this definition in the Green's second identity with  results in

In particular, this demonstrates that the Laplacian is a self-adjoint operator in the  inner product for functions vanishing on the boundary so that the right hand side of the above identity is zero.

Green's third identity
Green's third identity derives from the second identity by choosing , where the Green's function  is taken to be a fundamental solution of the Laplace operator, ∆.  This means that:

A simplification arises if  is itself a harmonic function, i.e. a solution to the Laplace equation.  Then  and the identity simplifies to

This form is used to construct solutions to Dirichlet boundary condition problems. Solutions for Neumann boundary condition problems may also be simplified, though the Divergence theorem applied to the differential equation defining Green's functions shows that the Green's function cannot integrate to zero on the boundary, and hence cannot vanish on the boundary.

In such a context, this identity is the mathematical expression of the Huygens principle, and leads to Kirchhoff's diffraction formula and other approximations.

On manifolds
Green's identities hold on a Riemannian manifold. In this setting, the first two are

Green's vector identity
Green's second identity establishes a relationship between second and (the divergence of) first order derivatives of two scalar functions. In differential form

This identity is of great importance in physics because continuity equations can thus be established for scalar fields such as mass or energy.

In vector diffraction theory, two versions of Green's second identity are introduced.

One variant invokes the divergence of a cross product  and states a relationship in terms of the curl-curl of the field

This equation can be written in terms of the Laplacians,

However, the terms

could not be readily written in terms of a divergence.

The other approach introduces bi-vectors, this formulation requires a dyadic Green function. The derivation presented here avoids these problems.

Consider that the scalar fields in Green's second identity are the Cartesian components of vector fields, i.e.,

Summing up the equation for each component, we obtain

The LHS according to the definition of the dot product may be written in vector form as

The RHS is a bit more awkward to express in terms of vector operators. Due to the distributivity of the divergence operator over addition, the sum of the divergence is equal to the divergence of the sum, i.e.,

Recall the vector identity for the gradient of a dot product,

which, written out in vector components is given by

This result is similar to what we wish to evince in vector terms 'except' for the minus sign. Since the differential operators in each term act either over one vector (say ’s) or the other (’s), the contribution to each term must be

These results can be rigorously proven to be correct through evaluation of the vector components. Therefore, the RHS can be written in vector form as

Putting together these two results, a result analogous to Green's theorem for scalar fields is obtained,
Theorem for vector fields: 

The curl of a cross product can be written as

Green's vector identity can then be rewritten as

Since the divergence of a curl is zero, the third term vanishes to yield Green's vector identity:

With a similar procedure, the Laplacian of the dot product can be expressed in terms of the Laplacians of the factors

As a corollary, the awkward terms can now be written in terms of a divergence by comparison with the vector Green equation,

This result can be verified by expanding the divergence of a scalar times a vector on the RHS.

See also
 Green's function
 Kirchhoff integral theorem
 Lagrange's identity (boundary value problem)

References

External links
 
 Green's Identities at Wolfram MathWorld

Vector calculus
Mathematical identities